The 1968–69 Weber State Wildcats men's basketball team represented Weber State College during the 1968–69 NCAA University Division basketball season. Members of the Big Sky Conference, the Wildcats were led by first-year head coach Phil Johnson and played their home games on campus at Wildcat Gym in Ogden, Utah.

For the second consecutive season, Weber State won the Big Sky title and played in the 25-team NCAA tournament.  In the West regional at Las Cruces, New Mexico, they defeated Seattle by two points and advanced to the Sweet Sixteen at Pauley Pavilion in Los Angeles,  against third-ranked Santa Clara.  The Broncos won by four points in overtime, and Weber won the third-place game over #12 New Mexico State by two.

Johnson had been an assistant coach at Weber under Dick Motta, his high school coach, who left to become head coach of the NBA's Chicago Bulls. After his third year as head coach of the Wildcats, Johnson joined Motta as an assistant in Chicago in 1971.

Postseason results

|-
!colspan=9 style=| NCAA Tournament

References

External links
Sports Reference – Weber State Wildcats: 1968–69 basketball season
2015–16 Media Guide: 1968–69 season

Weber State Wildcats men's basketball seasons
Weber State